The 1971 Furman Paladins football team was an American football team that represented Furman University as a member of the Southern Conference (SoCon) during the 1971 NCAA University Division football season. In their 14th season under head coach Bob King, Furman compiled a 5–5–1 record, with a mark of 2–3 in conference play, placing fifth in the SoCon.

Schedule

References

Furman
Furman Paladins football seasons
Furman Paladins football